A Bengali Kayastha is a Bengali Hindu who is a member of the Kayastha community. The historical caste occupation of Kayasthas throughout India has been that of scribes, administrators, ministers and record-keepers; the Kayasthas in Bengal, along with Brahmins and Baidyas, are regarded among the three traditional higher castes that comprise the "upper layer of Hindu society." During the British Raj, the Bhadraloks of Bengal were drawn primarily, but not exclusively, from these three castes, who continue to maintain a collective hegemony in West Bengal.

History

The social and religious patterns of Bengal had historically been distinctively different from those in the orthodox Hindu heartland of North India and this impacted on how the caste system developed there. Bengal, being located east of the traditional Aryavarta (Aryan) region between the Ganges and Yamuna rivers, remained insulated from the full impact of Brahminical orthodoxy for many centuries, and the impact of Buddhism remained strong there. During the reign of the Gupta Empire beginning in the 4th century AD, when systematic and large-scale colonization by Aryan Kayasthas and Brahmins first took place, Kayasthas were brought over by the Guptas to help manage the affairs of state. But the influence of Buddhism continued under the Buddhist rulers of the Pala dynasty from the eighth through the eleventh century CE. Of note, the Kayasthas had not yet crystallised into a caste, and represented a professional group.

According to Tej Ram Sharma, an Indian historian, the office of Kayastha in Bengal was instituted before the Gupta period ( to 550 CE), although there is no reference to Kayastha as a caste at that time. He says that  
Sharma also mentions that D. R. Bhandarkar "has pointed out that identical surnames are used by the Nagara-brahmanas".
Referring to some medieval literature, Rabindra Nath Chakraborty mentions that according to such medieval texts, "the Kayasthas were descended from Nagara Brahmin who had a large settlement in Bengal in the eighth century AD".

According to André Wink, another historian, the caste is first referred to around the 5th–6th century CE, and may well have become so identified during the period of the Sena dynasty. Between that time and the 11th–12th century, this category of officials or scribes was composed of "putative" Kshatriyas and, "for the larger majority", Brahmins, who retained their caste identity or became Buddhists. As in South India, Bengal had lacked a clearly defined Kshatriya caste. The Pala, Sena, Chandra, and Varman dynasties and their descendants, who claimed the status of Kshatriya, "almost imperceptibly merged" with the Kayastha caste, "which also ranked as shudras". However, Richard M. Eaton opines that, after absorption of remnants of these dynasties, Kayastha became "the region's surrogate Kshatriya or warrior class".

Sekhar Bandyopadhyay also places their emergence as a caste after the Gupta period. In the eleventh century, Bengal was in the grip of Brahminism. The Kayastha evolved into a caste (from a professional group) in the 10th-11th century CE. Ancient scripts and inscriptions record a class of royal officials of writers or accountants, denoted as Karana or Kayastha. Lexicographer Vaijayanti (11th century CE) appears to consider Kayastha and Karana as being synonymous and depicts them as scribes. Two early scriptures of Bengal also note a caste group called Karana. Some scholars consider Karana and Kayastha castes as identical or equivalent. Other scholars claim that the Karana and Kayastha castes eventually fused to form a single caste in Bengal like other parts of India. Referring to the linkages between class and caste in Bengal, Bandyopadhyay mentions that the Kayasthas along with the Brahmins and Baidyas, refrained from physical labour but controlled land, and as such represented "the three traditional higher castes of Bengal". Eaton mentions that the Kayasthas continued as the "dominant landholding caste" even after the Muslim conquests on the Indian subcontinent, and absorbed the descendants of the region's old Hindu rulers. 

In Bengal, between 1500 and 1850 CE, the Kayasthas were regarded as one of the highest Hindu castes in the region.

Varna status
The Hindu community in Bengal was divided into only two Varnas: Brahmins and Shudras. Hence, although the Bengali Kayasthas and Baidyas had a high social status along with Brahmins, their ritual status was low, according to Edmund Leach, S. N. Mukherjee, though it seems their ritual status is a subject of dispute as per other historians.

Colonial era
A survey of Indian writers and observers suggests that many of those acquainted with the Kayasthas considered them as Dvija or twice-born. According to Bellenoit, Rabindranath Tagore supported the claims of Kshatriya origin,  because of their "respectability and prominence in administration and overall rates of literacy". Abdul Sharar, who was well acquainted with them also supported their claims of twice-born origin citing their high literacy rate which a Shudra caste could not have achieved. However, the claims of Bengali Kayasthas of having Dvija status was not supported by Indian observers like Jogendra Nath Bhattacharya who cited their rituals to refute their claims. The Report of the 1931 census of Bengal noted that, the 'better-placed' Kayastha community claimed Kshatriya status.

Modern views
Professor Julius J. Lipner mentions that the varna status of the Bengali Kayasthas is disputed, and says that while some authorities consider that they "do not belong to the twice-born orders, being placed high up among the Shudras; for other authorities they are on a level with Kshatriyas, and are accorded twice-born status." According to John Henry Hutton, Kayastha is an important caste in Bengal, the caste is now "commonly regarded as 'twice-born', and itself claims to be Kshatriya, though it was perhaps more often regarded as clean Sudra a hundred years ago". Sanyal mentions that due to the lack of Vaishya and Kshatriya categories in Bengal, all non-Brahmin castes of Bengal, including the so-called "higher castes" are considered as Shudras; the Bengali Kayasthas are considered among the three uchchajatis or higher castes as their social standing has been high. Lloyd Rudolph and Susanne Rudolph mention that Ronald Inden (an anthropologist), after spending part of 1964-'65 in Bengal, states in his dissertation on Kayasthas that inter-caste marriages are increasing among the urban educated "twice-born castes", Kayasthas, Brahmins, and Baidyas.

Subcastes

Kulin Kayastha and Maulika Kayastha
According to Inden, "many of the higher castes of India have historically been organised into ranked clans or lineages". The Bengali Kayastha was organised into smaller sub-castes and even smaller ranked grades of clans (kulas) around 1500 CE. The four major subcastes were Daksina-radhi, Vangaja, Uttara-radhi and Varendra. The Daksina-radhi and Vangaja subcastes were further divided into Kulina or Kulin ("high clan rank") and Maulika or Maulik, the lower clan rank. The Maulika had four further "ranked grades". The Uttara-radhi and Varendra used the terms "Siddha", "Sadhya", "Kasta" and "Amulaja" to designate the grades in their subcastes.

Origin myths
Bellenoit  states that the Bengali Kayasthas are "largely seen as an offshoot of the main north Indian Kayasthas, they claim lineage from migrations into Bengal from the ancient capital of Kanauj at the request of Hindu Kings (900s) to settle the countryside. These Kayasthas took on the well known names of Ghosh, Mitra and Dutt. Over time they fashioned themselves as a Gaur subdivision of a broader Kayastha group, who claimed north Indian origins".
Kulin Kayasthas, a subcaste of Bengali Kayasthas have an associated myth of origin stating that five Kayasthas accompanied the Brahmins from Kannauj who had been invited to Bengal by the mythological king Adisur. Multiple versions of this legend exist, all considered by historians to be myth or folklore lacking historical authenticity. According to Swarupa Gupta this legend was  According to this legend, the five original Kayastha clans are Bose/Basu, Ghosh, Mitra, Guha, and Datta, the first four of whom became Kulin Kayasthas.

Notable people
 Pratapaditya, the king of Jessore who declared independence from Mughal rule in the early 17th century,
 Kirtinarayan Basu, 17th-century Raja of Chandradwip who converted to Islam
 Sri Aurobindo, Indian philosopher, yogi and nationalist.
 Nagendranath Basu, historian and editor
 Jagadish Chandra Bose, Indian scientist
 Subhas Chandra Bose, popularly known as Netaji ("Respected Leader")
 Debapratim Purkayastha, Indian educator and bestselling author
Satyendra Prasanna Sinha, 1st Baron Sinha
Swami Vivekananda (b. Narendranath Datta)
 Paramahansa Yogananda, author of ‘Autobiography of a Yogi’.

References
Citations

Bibliography

 

 

 

Bengali Hindu surnames
Bengali Hindu castes
Kayastha